The 2002–03 season are the Esteghlal Football Club's 2nd season in the Iran Pro League, and their 9th consecutive season in the top division of Iranian football. They are also competing in the Hazfi Cup and AFC Champions League, and 58th year in existence as a football club.

Club

Kit 

|
|
|}

Coaching staff

Other information

Player
As of 1 September 2013. Esteghlal F.C. Iran Pro League Squad 2002–03

Competitions

Overview

Iran Pro League

Standings

Results summary

Results by round

Matches

Hazfi Cup

Round of 32

Round of 16

AFC Champions League

Group stage

Group C

See also
 2002–03 Iran Pro League
 2002–03 Hazfi Cup
 2002–03 AFC Champions League

References

External links
 Iran Premier League Statistics
 RSSSF

2002-03
Iranian football clubs 2002–03 season